Akela Cooper is an American screenwriter and television producer. She is notable as the screenwriter of horror films, such as Hell Fest (2018), Malignant (2021), M3GAN (2022), The Nun 2 (2023), and M3GAN 2.0 (2025). Cooper was named to Varietys 10 Screenwriters to Watch for 2021 list.

Early life and education
Cooper was raised in Hayti, Missouri. She graduated from Truman State University with a degree in creative writing in 2003 and received her MFA from the USC School of Cinema-Television, where she was the first recipient of the NAACP/CBS Writer's Fellowship.

Career
Cooper was a staff writer for Grimm for two seasons and went on to be a writer and co-producer for The 100, American Horror Story, Luke Cage, Jupiter's Legacy, Witches of East End, and Chambers. She wrote the horror film Malignant, released in September 2021. She is the screenwriter of the upcoming sequel to the horror film The Nun, as well as the 2022 horror film M3GAN and its sequel. Cooper was announced as the showrunner for the upcoming HBO Max television adaptation of the novel Monster by A. Lee Martinez.

Filmography 

Film writer
 Hell Fest (2018)
 Malignant (2021)
 M3GAN (2022)
 The Nun 2 (2023)
 M3GAN 2.0 (2025)

Television

Awards and nominations 
 2017 – Nominee, NAACP Image Award for Outstanding Writing in a Drama Series (for Luke Cage)
 2017 – Nominee, Black Reel Award for Outstanding Drama Series (for Luke Cage)

References

External links 
 Akela Cooper on Twitter
 

Year of birth missing (living people)
Living people
African-American screenwriters
Screenwriters from Missouri
University of Southern California alumni
American horror writers
American women film producers
USC School of Cinematic Arts alumni
People from Hayti, Missouri
Television producers from Missouri
21st-century American women writers
Truman State University alumni
21st-century African-American women writers
21st-century African-American writers
21st-century American screenwriters
Women horror writers